Kapsas is a community in Greece

Kapsas may also refer to:
Kapsas, a person of Kapsai ethnic subgroup of Lithuanians

People with the surname
Vincas Kapsas or Vincas Kudirka, a Lithuanian poet